Henry Major Tomlinson (21 June 1873 – 5 February 1958) was a British writer and journalist. He was known for anti-war and travel writing, novels and short stories, especially of life at sea. He was born and died in London.

Life
Tomlinson was brought up in Poplar, London. He worked as a shipping clerk, and then as a reporter for the Morning Leader newspaper; he travelled up the Amazon River for it.

In World War I he was an official correspondent for the British Army, in France. In 1917 he returned to work with H. W. Massingham on The Nation, which opposed the war. He left the paper in 1923, when Massingham resigned because of a change of owner and political line. His 1931 book Norman Douglas was one of the first biographies of that scandalous but then much admired writer.

Works 

 The Sea and the Jungle. Being the narrative of the voyage of the tramp steamer Capella from Swansea to Santa Maria de Belem do Grao Para in the Brazils (1912)
 Old Junk (1918) stories
London River (1921) revised 1951
Waiting for Daylight (1922)
Tidemarks: Some Records of a Journey to the Beaches of the Moluccas and the Forest of Malaya in 1923 (1924)
Gifts of Fortune With Some Hints For Those About to Travel (1926)
Under the Red Ensign (1926)
Gallions Reach (novel) (1927) 
Out Of Soundings (1928)
A Brown Owl (1928)
Illusion: 1915 (1928)
Thomas Hardy (1929)
Côte d'Or (1929)
Between the Lines (1930)
War Books: A Lecture Given at Manchester University 15 February 1929 (1930)
All Our Yesterdays (1930)
The Sky's the Limit (1930)
Great Sea Stories of All Nations (1930) editor
Best Short Stories Of the War (1931) editor
Norman Douglas (1931)
An Illustrated Catalogue of Rare Books on the East Indies and A Letter to a Friend (1932)
The Snows of Helicon (1933)
South to Cadiz (1934)
Below London Bridge (1934)
Mars His Idiot (1935)
RMS Queen Mary, a noble tribute to the imagination of man (1935) with E. P. Leigh-Bennett
Pipe All Hands (1937) novel
The Day Before: A Romantic Chronicle (1939)
Modern Travel (1939) editor, anthology
Ports of Call (1939) in The Queen's Book of the Red Cross
The Wind is Rising. The war diary of H. M. Tomlinson and a vision of all our tomorrows (1941)
The Turn of the Tide (1945)
Morning Light: The Islanders in the Days of Oak and Hemp (1946)
Malay waters. the story of little ships coasting out of Singapore and Penang in peace and war (1950)
The Face of the Earth (1950)
The Haunted Forest (1951)
A Mingled Yarn: Autobiographical Sketches (1953)
H. M. Tomlinson: a Selection from His Writings (1953) edited by Kenneth Hopkins
The Trumpet Shall Sound (1957)

Reception
Tomlinson was much admired in the 1920s. In 1921, Christopher Morley praised what he saw as the "exquisite, considered prose" to be found in Tomlinson's 1918 book of essays, Old Junk:How direct and satisfying a passage to the mind Mr. Tomlinson's paragraphs have. How they build and cumulate, how the sentences shift, turn and move in delicate loops and ridges under the blowing wind of thought, like the sand of the dunes that he describes in one essay. Frederic P. Mayer, however, writing in the Virginia Quarterly Review, expressed a less admiring view:

Notes

References 
 Mayer, Frederick P. H.M. Tomlinson: The Eternal Youth. Virginia Quarterly Review, Winter 1928, pp 72–82.

External links 

 
 
 
 
 The Sea and the Jungle text at ibiblio.org
 Henry Major Tomlinson Collection. General Collection. Beinecke Rare Book and Manuscript Library.

1873 births
1958 deaths
20th-century British male writers
20th-century British novelists
20th-century British short story writers
British journalists
British male journalists
British male novelists
British male short story writers
British short story writers
British travel writers
People from Poplar, London